K. Sivanesan may refer to:

 Kiddinan Sivanesan (1957–2008), Sri Lankan member of parliament for Jaffna District
 Kandiah Sivanesan, Sri Lankan provincial councillor for Mullaitivu District